is a passenger railway station located in the city of Miki, Hyōgo Prefecture, Japan, operated by the private Kobe Electric Railway (Shintetsu).

Lines

Station layout
The station consists of a ground-level side platform serving a single bi-directional track. The station is unattended.

Adjacent stations

History
Ōmura Station opened on December 28, 1951. It was renamed  on October 1, 1952, and reverted to its original name on April 1, 1988.

Passenger statistics
In fiscal 2019, the station was used by an average of 493 passengers daily.

Surrounding area
 Kongoji Temple
 Omura Hospital
 Miki City Hirata Elementary School

See also
List of railway stations in Japan

References

External links

  Official website (Kobe Electric Railway) 

Railway stations in Japan opened in 1951
Railway stations in Hyōgo Prefecture
Miki, Hyōgo